The Tianjin Ronggang Pioneers or Tianjin Ronggang or Tianjin Pioneers are a Chinese professional basketball team based in Tianjin, which plays in the Northern Division of the Chinese Basketball Association (CBA). The Ronggang Import & Export Trade Company, Ltd., is the club's corporate sponsor while its mascot is a gold lion.

History
Tianjin's team joined the league ahead of the 2008–09 CBA season as an expansion club, and is still seeking its first championship as of the 2015–16 CBA season.

Roster

Notable players

  /  Hervé Lamizana (2009–2012)
  Donnell Harvey (2011–2013)
  Zaid Abbas (2013–2014)
  Sebastian Telfair (2013–2014)
  Shelden Williams (2013–2015)
  Shang Ping (2014–)
  Quincy Douby (2014)
  Dwight Buycks (2014–2015)
  Jason Maxiell (2015–2016)
  Casper Ware (2015–2016)
  Jordan Crawford (2015–)
  Tien Lei (2014–)

External links 
 Tianjin Ronggang Pioneers official website

 
Chinese Basketball Association teams
Sport in Tianjin